William Ward Johnson (March 9, 1892 – June 8, 1963) was an American lawyer and politician who served two terms as a U.S. Representative from California from 1941 to 1945.

Biography 
Born in Brighton, Washington County, Iowa, Johnson attended the public schools at Brighton and at Twin Falls, Idaho, and the University of California at Berkeley in 1913 and 1914.
He was graduated from the law school of the University of Southern California at Los Angeles in 1925.
He served as member of the Idaho National Guard in 1910 and 1911. After that, he worked as bookkeeper, stenographer, and manager of an automobile company at Montpelier, Idaho, and Price, Utah from 1912 to 1918.
He engaged in the mercantile business in Idaho and Utah from 1918 to 1922.
He also engaged in the banking and oil business at Twin Falls, Idaho, and Long Beach, California.
He was admitted to the bar in 1925 and commenced practice as a lawyer in Long Beach.

Congress 
Johnson was elected as a Republican to the Seventy-seventh and Seventy-eighth Congresses (January 3, 1941 – January 3, 1945). He was an unsuccessful candidate for reelection in 1944 to the Seventy-ninth Congress.

Later career and death 
He resumed the practice of law in Long Beach, California, until his death there on June 8, 1963.
He was interred in Sunnyside Mausoleum.

References

1892 births
1963 deaths
People from Twin Falls, Idaho
Idaho National Guard personnel
Republican Party members of the United States House of Representatives from California
People from Washington County, Iowa
20th-century American politicians